The 2021 National Premier Soccer League season was the 19th season of the National Premier Soccer League and part of the 109th season of FIFA-sanctioned soccer in the United States. The 2020 season was cancelled after five weeks of play due to the COVID-19 pandemic. Miami FC, the defending league champions from 2019, left in the previous off-season and joined the National Independent Soccer Association and later the USL Championship.

The regular season started on May 1 and concluded on July 17. In total, 76 teams participated this season with a further 14 playing in conferences that decided not to participate in the summer season.

Format changes
The 2021 season saw a number of changes with many in part due to the ongoing effects of the pandemic. Both the Northwest and Golden Gate Conference will not take part in traditional summer season. The NPSL later announced the Golden Gate teams would play a regular season schedule, but with it commencing in June and ending in August meaning none of the teams would be eligible for the postseason or U.S. Open Cup berths. Due to this, the South Region's Lone Star Conference joined the west for 2021 allowing two separate conferences to compete for the regional title.

The changes made ahead of last season, such as the renaming of the Northeast Region to the "East Region", the Southeast Conference's move to the East, and the renaming of the East Conference to the "Rust Belt Conference" all remained in effect. The Gulf Coast Conference, which was created ahead of 2020, will play its inaugural season in 2021.

Teams
Note: Teams that are italicized previously played in the NPSL and are returning from hiatus.

Incoming teams
Appalachian FC (Boone, NC)
Arkansas Wolves FC (Little Rock, AR)
Contra Costa FC (Concord/Walnut Creek, CA)
Florida Roots Futbol Club (Panama City, FL)
Georgia Storm Soccer Academy (Carrollton, GA)
Irving FC (Irving, TX)
Joy St. Louis Park (St. Louis Park, MN)
Katy 1895 FC (Katy, TX)
New York Shockers (Albany, NY)
Oakland Stompers (Oakland, CA)
OKC 1889 FC (Oklahoma City, OK)
Panathinaikos Chicago (Chicago, IL)
Reign FK (Bartlesville, OK)
Sioux Falls Thunder FC (Sioux Falls, SD)
Southern States SC (Hattiesburg, MS)

Departing teams
Fort Wayne FC (Fort Wayne, IN)(joined USL League Two)
Kalamazoo FC (Kalamazoo, MI)(joined USL League Two)
Little Rock Rangers (Little Rock, AR)(joined USL League Two)
Maryland Bobcats FC (Montgomery County, MD)(joined the National Independent Soccer Association)
Project 51O (Oakland, CA)(joined USL League Two)
Toledo Villa FC (Toledo, OH)(joined USL League Two)

Teams on hiatus
Austin United FC (Austin, TX)
Charlottesville Alliance FC (Charlottesville, VA)
Inter Nashville FC (Nashville, TN)

Name changes
Georgia Storm Soccer Academy to Georgia Storm
East Bay FC Stompers to Oakland Stompers

Unknown status teams
A.S. Los Angeles (Whittier, CA)
Club Atletico Saint Louis (Saint Louis, MO)
Club Xolos USA U-23 (Riverside, CA)
High Desert Elite FC (Adelanto, CA)
Muskegon Risers SC (Muskegon, MI)
Nashville United (Nashville, TN)
New York Athletic Club S.C. (Westchester County, NY)
Oxnard Guerreros FC (Oxnard, CA)
Ozark FC (Springdale, AR)
Rhode Island Reds FC (Johnston, RI)

2021 Teams
Note: Teams lined out are on hiatus due to the COVID-19 pandemic but still listed on the league website.

Standings and results

West Region

Lone Star Conference

Southwest Conference

Midwest Region

Great Lakes Conference

North Conference

Rust Belt Conference

South Region

Gulf Coast Conference

Heartland Conference

Sunshine Conference

East Region

Keystone Conference

Mid-Atlanic Conference

North Atlantic Conference

Southeast Conference

Playoffs
Note: Games are hosted by the highest seed unless noted otherwise

West Region Conference playoffs

Lone Star Conference playoffs

Bold = winner
* = after extra time, = penalty shootout score

Southwest Conference playoffs

Bold = winner
* = after extra time, = penalty shootout score

South Region Conference playoffs

Gulf Coast Conference playoffs

Bold = winner
* = after extra time, = penalty shootout score

Heartland Conference playoffs

Bold = winner
* = after extra time, = penalty shootout score

Sunshine Conference playoffs

Bold = winner
* = after extra time, = penalty shootout score

East Region Conference playoffs

Keystone Conference playoffs

Bold = winner
* = after extra time, = penalty shootout score

Mid-Atlantic Conference playoffs

Bold = winner
* = after extra time, = penalty shootout score

North Atlantic Conference playoffs

Bold = winner
* = after extra time, = penalty shootout score

Southeast Conference playoffs

Bold = winner
* = after extra time, = penalty shootout score

Regional and National playoffs

Bold = winner* = after extra time, = penalty shootout score

2021 NPSL National Championship 

Championship MVP: Trevor Amann (DEN)

Return to Play Series
In early 2021, the NPSL announced the "Return to Play Series" which was originally meant to act as a series of competitive matches ahead of the 2021 summer season between league members. However, following the continued effects of the COVID-19 pandemic and the uncertain nature of west coast conferences the format was altered to act as a separate competition from the summer season. The eight members of the Golden Gate Conference were later announced as participants in the "Golden Gate Competition" with a round robin format scheduled over June and July.

Golden Gate Competition

Playoffs
Note: Games are hosted by the highest seed unless noted otherwise

Bold = winner
* = after extra time, = penalty shootout score

References

External links
Official National Premier Soccer League website

 
2021
2021 in American soccer leagues
Association football events postponed due to the COVID-19 pandemic